This is the list of notable stars in the constellation Capricornus, sorted by decreasing brightness.

See also
List of stars by constellation

References

List
Capricornus